Vasile Serghei is a Romanian sprint canoer who competed in the early 1970s. He won two medals at the ICF Canoe Sprint World Championships with a silver (C-2 10000 m: 1973) and a bronze (C-2 1000 m: 1974).

References

Living people
Romanian male canoeists
Year of birth missing (living people)
ICF Canoe Sprint World Championships medalists in Canadian